Crown Point is a town in southwestern Tobago, Trinidad and Tobago. It contains the A.N.R. Robinson International Airport which was formerly known as the Crown Point International Airport. It is near Store Bay, Buccoo Reef, and Pigeon Point. Crusoe Cave is located nearby.

History 
The name component "Crown" does not derive from the English word "crown", but from the Englisch word "couronian", referring to the Duchy of Courland and Semigallia that ruled over Tobago in the late 17th century.

Lighthouse 
Crown Point Lighthouse is an active lighthouse located in Scarborough, on the south west extremity of Tobago in the nearby the airport.

See also
List of lighthouses in Trinidad and Tobago

References

Populated places in Tobago